Novofedorivka or Novofyodorovka is an urban-type settlement. 

Population:

History

Back in the 5th century BC there was an ancient Greek settlement on the site of Novofedorovka, archaeological excavations of which in the 1980s were carried out by the Crimean archaeologist S. Lantsov.

Until 1917, there were several buildings on the territory of the village, the “Scarlet” dacha, the owner of which supplied therapeutic mud to Livadia for the treatment of the hemophiliac Alexei Nikolaevich, Tsarevich of Russia. On the map of the Crimean Statistical Office of 1922, Novo-Fyodorovka is not yet marked. But according to the "List of settlements of the Crimean ASSR according to the All-Union census on December 17, 1926", the village of Novo-Fedorovka had 28 households, 26 of which were peasants, the population was 124 people: 118 of them were Russians and 6 were Armenians Crimean ASSR.

In the 1930s, an unpaved airfield, which was to become Saky (air base), was built for the Kachinsky School of Military Pilots. During the German occupation of 1941-1944, an artificial surface was added to the airfield. In February 1945, the airfield received Winston Churchill's and Franklin Roosevelt's aircraft, when it arrived at the Yalta Conference. 

According to a decree of the Supreme Council of the Republic of Crimea dated 12 December 1992, the urban-type settlement of Novofedorovka was formed as part of the Orekhovsky village council of the Saki district. In November 1995, a separate Novofedorovsky village council was formed. 

The area came under Ukrainian Navy control with the dissolution of the Soviet Union.

Russo-Ukrainian War
During the 2014 annexation of Crimea, Russian forces occupied the town and nearby Saky airbase. 

On 9 August 2022, during the Russian invasion of Ukraine, several very large explosions occurred at the nearby Saky air base. The explosions were focused on the  extensive aircraft dispersal complex to the north and west of the runway complex.

References

Port cities of the Black Sea
Urban-type settlements in Crimea
Populated places established in 1992
Saky Raion
Former closed cities